Raymond Froment (1913–1990) was a French film producer.

Selected filmography
 Singoalla (1949)
 My Seal and Them (1951)
 House of Ricordi (1954)
 Typhoon Over Nagasaki (1957)
 Last Year at Marienbad (1961)
 The Day and the Hour (1963)
 Anatomy of a Marriage: My Days with Françoise (1964)
 Anatomy of a Marriage: My Days with Jean-Marc (1964)
 Un monde nouveau (1966)
 The Uninhibited (1965)
 Nuits Rouges (1974)

References

Bibliography
 Tim Palmer & Charlie Michael. Directory of World Cinema: France. Intellect Books, 2013.

External links

1913 births
1990 deaths
French film producers